This is a list of the main career statistics of Brazilian tennis player, Fernando Meligeni.

Records and career milestones

Fernando 'Fino' Meligeni is one of the most successful brazilian tennis players. He reached a career high of World no. 25 in October 1999 at singles and a career high World no. 34 in November 1997 at doubles. He won 10 ATP Tour titles, three in singles and seven in doubles. At the Summer Olympics in 1996, he reached the semi-finals, losing in the Bronze-medal match to Leander Paes, in what remains as the most successful run of Brazil in tennis at the Olympic Games. 

He won the Gold medal at the 2003 Pan American Games, beating Marcelo Ríos in his final career match.

Other career highlights include finishing inside the ATP rankings top-100 year-end for ten consecutive years, from 1993 to 2002 and 10 ATP Challenger titles (seven in singles and three in doubles).

Career finals

Olympic Games

Singles: 1 (4th place)

Pan American Games

Singles: 1 (1 gold medal)

ATP World Tour

Singles: 6 (3 titles, 3 runner-ups)

Doubles: 7 (7 titles)

ATP Challenger Tour

Singles: 13 (7 titles, 6 runner-ups)

Doubles: 10 (3 titles, 7 runner-ups)

Satellite tournaments

Singles: 4 (2 titles, 2 runner-ups)

Singles performance timeline

1The Masters Series included the Canada Masters and the Cincinnati Masters, but Meligeni never played in these tournaments.
2This event was held in Stockholm until 1994, Essen in 1995, Stuttgart from 1996 through 2001 and Madrid from 2002 on.

Titles detail

Notes:
 1995: Defeated three seeded players, en route to title: Schaller (2nd), Costa (5th) and Ruud (6th).
 1996: In terms of games played, this was the most difficult title for Meligeni: 120 games and three tiebreaks.
 1998: Defeated top-10 Kafelnikov (6) in the quarterfinal match; first top-10 win of that year (defeated Kafelnikov again, in Gstaad).
 2003: Final event of Meligeni's career. Entered the event with a bye into the second round. Only victory over Ríos as a professional player.

Grand Slam singles seedings

Record against top 10 players
Meligeni's match record against those who have been ranked in the top 10, with those who have been No. 1 in bold (ATP Tour, Grand Slam and Davis Cup matches).

 Pete Sampras: 1–1
 Andre Agassi: 0–5
 Emilio Sánchez: 2–2
 Wayne Ferreira: 0–2
 Mikael Pernfors: 1–0
 Mats Wilander: 1–3
 Alberto Berasategui: 1–3
 Goran Ivanišević: 0–3
 Karel Nováček: 1–0
 Àlex Corretja: 2–6
 Thomas Muster: 0–4
 Thomas Enqvist: 0–1
 Carlos Costa: 2–2
 Magnus Norman: 1–0
 Guy Forget: 0–1
 Jiří Novák: 0–5
 Michael Chang: 1–2
 Patrick Rafter: 2–1
 Andrei Chesnokov: 1–1
 Albert Costa: 2–2
 Mark Philippoussis: 1–0
 Sergi Bruguera: 1–2
 Marcelo Ríos: 0–4
 Gustavo Kuerten: 0–4
 Karol Kučera: 3–0
 Magnus Larsson: 1–1
 Félix Mantilla: 1–5
 Yevgeny Kafelnikov: 2–3
 Andrei Medvedev: 1–3
 Todd Martin: 0–3
 Tommy Haas: 0–1
 Magnus Gustafsson: 1–2
 Greg Rusedski: 0–1
 Nicolás Massú: 1–2
 Marc Rosset: 3–0
 Tim Henman: 1–1
 Cédric Pioline: 3–2
 Thomas Johansson: 2–2
 Gastón Gaudio: 1–2
 Carlos Moyá: 1–4
 Nicolás Lapentti: 1–2
 Lleyton Hewitt: 0–3
 Guillermo Cañas: 0–1
 Marat Safin: 0–2
 Richard Krajicek: 0–1
 David Nalbandian: 0–2
 Guillermo Coria: 2–1
 Andy Roddick: 1–2
 Arnaud Clément: 1–1
 Nikolay Davydenko: 1–1
 Radek Štěpánek: 1–0
 Paradorn Srichaphan: 0–1
 Mardy Fish: 0–1
 James Blake: 0–1
 Tommy Robredo: 0–1
 Fernando González: 0–1
 Juan Carlos Ferrero: 0–1
 Petr Korda: 1–0
 Jim Courier: 0–1

Top 10 wins

Davis Cup

Participations: (13–16)

   indicates the outcome of the Davis Cup match followed by the score, date, place of event, the zonal classification and its phase, and the court surface.

References 
General sources
Information about career finals, Grand Slam seedings, singles and doubles performance timelines, head-to-head records against top-10 players, and national team participation are from these sources:

 
 
 
 

References

Tennis career statistics